The 1990 Andhra Pradesh cyclone or the 1990 Machilipatnam Cyclone was the worst disaster to affect Southern India since the 1977 Andhra Pradesh cyclone. During the next day the depression intensified into a cyclonic storm and started to intensify rapidly, becoming a super cyclonic storm early on 8 May. While over land the cyclone gradually dissipated. The cyclone had a severe impact on India, with over 967 people reported to have been killed. Over 100,000 animals also died in the cyclone with the total cost of damages to crops estimated at over $ (1990 USD).

Meteorological history

During that day the system gradually developed further and became the subject of a Tropical Cyclone Formation Alert, by the Joint Typhoon Warning Center as it moved westwards under the influence of the subtropical ridge of high pressure. The depression subsequently intensified into a cyclonic storm early the next day, before the JTWC initiated advisories on the system and designated it as Tropical Cyclone 02B later that day. At this stage the JTWC only expected the cyclone to intensify marginally, before it weakened as it made landfall in Southern India within 72 hours. During 6 May, the system started to move more towards the north-west because of a weakness in the subtropical ridge, as it continued to intensify and became a Very Severe Cyclonic Storm. This turn towards the northwest turned out to be more northerly than had been expected, which as a result allowed the system to stay offshore for longer than had been expected by the JTWC.

The system subsequently started to weaken and had become a Very Severe Cyclonic Storm by the time it made landfall during 9 May, near the mouth of the Krishna River in southern Andhra Pradesh. The system subsequently moved north-westwards and gradually weakened further, before it was last noted during 11 May, by both the IMD and JTWC.

Preparations and impact

Preparations
As a result of timely warnings issued by the IMD, the Indian government was able to launch an evacuation campaign and order that all fisherman return to shore. This led to more than 150,000 people being evacuated to relief camps which had been set up on higher ground. Due to the thorough preparations, there was fewer deaths than in the 1977 Andhra Pradesh cyclone.

Impact
On Edurumondi Island over 7,000 people were left stranded after they refused to evacuate. The island itself was reported to have experienced the full brunt of the system. However, all of the residents reportedly sought protection within a shelter provided by the government. The cyclone had a significant effect on India, with storm surge tides as high as 4.9 meters (16 ft) above normal. Consequently, over 100 villages were submerged in water and destroyed. At least 967 people were killed by the cyclone; most of the deaths occurred when houses made mostly out of mud and straw collapsed. Other people were killed when electrical wires were knocked down and while some people were carried away by flooded rivers. The storm left at least 3 million people homeless, while over 100,000 farm animals were killed. At least  of rice paddies were destroyed along with huge tracts of mango and banana trees. The total damage to crops and property was estimated at over $ (1990 USD). The cyclone was described as the worst disaster in southern India since the 1977 storm. Sea water contaminated fresh drinking wells, prompting warnings about outbreaks of Cholera and Typhoid as many people were drinking and cooking with water from the drains which was causing stomach disorders.

Tamil Nadu
Overall the cyclone only caused minor damage to Tamil Nadu with the worst affected area being the district of Chengalpattu, where one of the old shrines of Kasiviswanathar Temple collapsed as high waves hit the coast. A large number of huts were also washed away by the waves, while six deaths were reported in the state.

Aftermath
On 11 May, two days after the cyclone had hit, the Indian Government launched a massive relief and rescue operation. The Indian Army and Naval helicopters took surveys of areas affected by the cyclone, and also dropped food packets. Although the Indian Government did not request international assistance, the Red Cross provided food, oil, medicines and water tanks for the affected families; the Commission on Inter-Church Aid, Refugee and World Service (CICARWS) at the World Council of Churches issued an appeal for $ (1990 USD) so they could provide immediate needs with World Vision providing $ (1990 USD) for food blankets and utensils.

See also

1990 North Indian Ocean cyclone season
1977 Andhra Pradesh cyclone

References

External links
Joint Typhoon Warning Center 
India Meteorological Department

Tropical cyclones in India
Andhra Pradesh Cyclone, 1990
Super cyclonic storms
Andhra Pradesh Cyclone, 1990
History of Andhra Pradesh (1947–2014)
Disasters in Andhra Pradesh